Children of the Light may refer to:

 Children of the Light (The Wheel of Time), characters in Robert Jordan's fantasy series The Wheel of Time
 Children of the Light (album), an album by The Jackson 5
 Children of the Light (film), a 2014 documentary film
 Sky: Children of the Light, a 2019 video game
 Religious Society of Friends, or Quakers, sometimes called Children of the Light
 Children of the Light, soundtrack from Harmagedon Genma Taisen anime movie

See also
 Children of Light (disambiguation)
 Child of the Light, a 1991 novel by Janet Berliner and George Guthridge
 Child of Light, a 2014 video game published by Ubisoft
 Children of the Night (disambiguation)